The Bulgarian Communist Party (BCP; Bulgarian: Българска комунистическа партия (БΚП), Romanised: Bŭlgarska komunisticheska partiya (BKP)) was the founding and ruling party of the People's Republic of Bulgaria from 1946 until 1989, when the country ceased to be a socialist state. The party had dominated the Fatherland Front, a coalition that took power in 1944, late in World War II, after it led a coup against Bulgaria's tsarist regime in conjunction with the Red Army's crossing the border. It controlled its armed forces, the Bulgarian People's Army.

The BCP was organized on the basis of democratic centralism, a principle introduced by the Russian Marxist scholar and leader Vladimir Lenin, which entails democratic and open discussion on policy on the condition of unity in upholding the agreed upon policies. The highest body of the BCP was the Party Congress, convened every fifth year. When the Party Congress was not in session, the Central Committee was the highest body, but since the body normally met only once a year, most duties and responsibilities were vested in the Politburo and its Standing Committee. The party's leader held the offices of General Secretary.

The BCP was committed to Marxism-Leninism, an ideology consisted of the writings of the German philosopher Karl Marx and of Lenin (from 1922 to 1956 as formulated by Soviet leader Joseph Stalin). In the 1960s, the BCP announced some economic reforms, which allowed the free sale of production that exceeded planned amounts. After Soviet Premier Mikhail Gorbachev took power in 1985, the BCP underwent political and economic liberalization, which promptly liquidated the party and dissolved the People's Republic of Bulgaria completely. After the end of the BCP, the party was renamed to the Bulgarian Socialist Party in 1990.

History

Origins 
The party's origins lay in the Bulgarian Social Democratic Workers' Party (Narrow Socialists) (Tesni Sotsialisti, "Narrow Socialists"), which was founded in 1903 after a split in the 10th Congress of the Bulgarian Social Democratic Workers' Party.

The party's founding leader was Dimitar Blagoev, who was the driving force behind the formation of the BSDWP in 1894.  It comprised most of the hardline Marxists in the Social Democratic Workers' Party.  The party opposed World War I and was sympathetic to the October Revolution in Russia. Under Blagoev's leadership, the party applied to join the Communist International upon its founding in 1919. Upon joining the Comintern the party was reorganised as the Communist Party of Bulgaria.

Georgi Dimitrov was a member of the party's Central Committee from its inception in 1919 until his death in 1949, also serving as Bulgaria's leader from 1946. In 1938 the party merged with the Bulgarian Workers' Party and took the former party's name.

Ruling party 

Following Dimitrov's sudden death, the party was led by Valko Chervenkov, a Stalinist who oversaw a number of party purges that met with Moscow's approval. The party joined the Cominform at its inception in 1948 and conducted purges against suspected "Titoites" following the expulsion of the Communist Party of Yugoslavia from the alliance. Suspected counter-revolutionaries were imprisoned. In 1948 the Bulgarian Social Democratic Workers Party (Broad Socialists) was forced to merge into the BKP, thus liquidating any left-wing alternative to the communists.

In March 1954, one year after Joseph Stalin's death, Chervenkov was deposed.

From 1954 until 1989 the party was led by Todor Zhivkov, who was very supportive of the Soviet Union and remained close to its leadership after Nikita Khrushchev was deposed by Leonid Brezhnev. His rule led to relative political stability and an increase in living standards. The demands for democratic reform which swept Eastern Europe in 1989 led Zhivkov to resign. He was succeeded by a considerably more liberal Communist, Petar Mladenov.  On 11 December Mladenov announced the party was giving up its guaranteed right to rule.  For all intents and purposes, this was the end of Communist rule in Bulgaria, though it would be another month before the provision in the constitution enshrining the party's "leading role" was deleted.

Post-1990 
The party moved in a more moderate direction, and by the spring of 1990 was no longer a Marxist-Leninist party.  That April, the party changed its name to the Bulgarian Socialist Party (BSP).  A number of hardline Communists established several splinter parties with a small number of members. One of these parties, named Communist Party of Bulgaria (Komunisticeska Partija na Balgarija), is led by Aleksandar Paunov.

Headquarters 
The Party House (Партийния дом, Partiyniya dom) served as the headquarters of the Bulgarian Communist Party, located at the Largo.  The Party House building was designed by a team under architect Petso Zlatev and was completed in 1955.

Leaders

Chairman of the Communist Party of Bulgaria

General Secretaries of the Bulgarian Communist Party (1948–1990)

Chairmen of the Bulgarian Communist Party (1990)

Organizational structure

Party congresses 
Congresses and national conferences adopt the program and statutes of the party, approve the accounts of the past periods, develop directives and decisions for further activity. They elect the central governing bodies of the party.

Central Committee 
The Central Committee of the BKP is the highest governing body that operates between congresses.

See also

Buzludzha
Eastern Bloc politics
History of Bulgaria

References

External links 
 

 
Defunct political parties in Bulgaria
Communist parties in Bulgaria
Comintern sections
Formerly ruling communist parties
Parties of one-party systems
Eastern Bloc
Political parties established in 1903
1903 establishments in Bulgaria
1990 disestablishments in Bulgaria
Political parties disestablished in 1990
Far-left political parties
Defunct communist parties
Organizations of the Revolutions of 1989